Jacqueline Dieudonné (born 30 June 1933) is a French former gymnast. She competed at the 1956 Summer Olympics and the 1960 Summer Olympics.

References

External links
 

1933 births
Living people
French female artistic gymnasts
Olympic gymnasts of France
Gymnasts at the 1956 Summer Olympics
Gymnasts at the 1960 Summer Olympics
Sportspeople from Gironde
20th-century French women
21st-century French women